During the 2009–10 English football season, Tranmere Rovers F.C. competed in Football League One.

Season summary
Jamaica manager John Barnes was appointed as Tranmere manager in mid-June, but only lasted until October. The Birkenhead club won only three of their first 14 games, culminating in a 5–0 loss at Millwall, with Barnes and his assistant Jason McAteer sacked six days later. Long-standing physio Les Parry was announced as caretaker manager, and was appointed permanently in December after winning 18 points during his time in charge. An away win at Stockport County on the last day of the season secured Tranmere's survival in League One, by a single point.

Kit
Tranmere's kits were manufactured by Vandanel and sponsored by the Wirral Metropolitan Council.

Players

First-team squad
Squad at end of season

Left club during season

References

Notes

Tranmere Rovers F.C. seasons
Tranmere Rovers F.C.